Joni Ikonen (born 14 April 1999) is a Finnish professional ice hockey forward currently playing for Lahti Pelicans of the Liiga. Ikonen was drafted by the Montreal Canadiens in the second round, 58th overall, in the 2017 NHL Entry Draft.

Playing career
Ikonen originally played as a youth in his native Finland, appearing at the Junior C and Junior B levels with the Blues before opting to continue his development in Sweden with Frölunda for the 2015–16 season, alongside fellow countryman Kristian Vesalainen. Ikonen made his professional debut at the senior level with Frölunda in the Swedish Hockey League during the 2016–17 season. After the season, he left the team due to contract disputes, and on 19 July 2017, signed with KalPa of the Finnish Liiga.

After two seasons with Ilves, Ikonen left to sign a one-year contract with fellow Liiga outfit, Lahti Pelicans, on 29 April 2022.

Personal
Ikonen's older brother, Juuso, is currently playing for HV71 in the SHL.

Career statistics

Regular season and playoffs

International

References

External links
 

1999 births
Living people
Sportspeople from Espoo
Finnish ice hockey centres
Frölunda HC players
Ilves players
KalPa players
Lahti Pelicans players
Montreal Canadiens draft picks